The following is a list of ecoregions in Cyprus, according to the Worldwide Fund for Nature (WWF):

Terrestrial

Mediterranean forests, woodlands, and scrub
 Cyprus Mediterranean forests

Freshwater
 Southern Anatolia

Marine
 Levantine Sea

 
Cyprus
Ecoregions